Kilfinan is a hamlet on the Cowal peninsula in Argyll and Bute, Scotland. Kilfinan is the burial place of the clan chiefs of the Lamonts, in the 13th-century Kilfinan Parish Church.

The hamlet is also home to the Kilfinan Hotel for over 300 years, which started off as a coaching inn.

Church of Saint Finan
The parish church of Saint Finan dates from the 13th century: the church was first recorded between 1231 and 1241 in a series of grants and confirmations by Duncan, second son of Ferchar, and his nephew young Laumon. Laumon was an ancestor of the Lamont family, who gave the church and all its rights, to the Cluniac Monks of Paisley Abbey, Paisley.

Interior
In 1633 the Lamont North Aisle was added. It was the work of Sir Coll Lamont, whose initials "S/CL" are carved in the east and west cavetto skewputts of the crowstepped north gable. The date 1633 also appears. Within a cusped frame on the lintel of the west doorway, the same date and initials are carved in relief, together with "D/BS" for Lamont's wife Dame Barbara Semple. There is late medieval work incorporated into the vault itself.

In 2015 and 2016, while restoration work was undertaken, the Ancient Stones were removed from the Lamont Vault. The earth floor was lowered and more medieval bones were revealed; at this time two 17th-century lead coffins were also discovered. It has been suggested that the coffins contain the remains of Sir Coll Lamont 1634 and his wife Dame Barbara Semple, whose initials appear on a lintel above the vault entrance. The Upper Lamont Aisle is now a modern Gallery. The Lamont Vault and Gallery today contain one of the best collections of ancient burial stones in the West of Scotland. The stone known as The Inveryne Stone is displayed in the gallery.

Exterior
In 1759 the bird-cage belfry was added at the west end of the church. The bell is dated 1832.

Swallows
Swallows nest at the church. For many years the rose window was broken and the swallows flew in to build their nests. Now the window is repaired visitors are reminded to leave the door open to give the swallows access.

Churchyard
The monument inscriptions of the graveyard have been fully catalogued. 
Most of the monuments in the churchyard are from the 18th and 19th centuries. In the 20th century burials in the parish took place at the (now disused) Kilbride church, on the west side of the Ardlamont peninsula, and more recently at the cemetery in Millhouse.
The graveyard also includes the McFarlane Vault, to the west of the church, and the Rankin Vault, on the south side of the burn.

Gallery

References

External links

Villages in Cowal
Highlands and Islands of Scotland